Short I or Yot/Jot (Й й; italics: Й ŭ) (sometimes called i-kratkoye) is a letter of the Cyrillic script. It is made of the Cyrillic letter И with a breve.

For more details, see romanization of Russian, romanization of Ukrainian, romanization of Belarusian and romanization of Bulgarian.

History

Because  was considered to be a vowel and not a consonant, it was not required to take a hard sign when it came at the end of a word in pre-reform orthography.

Usage

It is used in other positions only in foreign words, such as Йopк (York, not with ), including fellow Slavic words like Йовович (Yovovich).

In Kazakh, the letter is used to represent a short ɪ sound (e.g. берейік (tr. (Let us) give)). The letter, much like the other 11 Cyrillic letters, will not have another Latin version and merge with Ии (İi).

In Serbo-Croatian and Macedonian, the Cyrillic letter Јe is used to represent the same sound. Latin-based Slavonic writing systems, such as Polish, Czech and the Latin version of Serbo-Croatian use the Latin letter J (not the letter Y, as in English or French), for that purpose.

Related letters and other similar characters

И и : Cyrillic letter I
Ы ы : Cyrillic letter Yery
Η η : Greek letter Eta
H h : Latin letter H
І і : Cyrillic letter І
I i : Latin letter I
Ĭ ĭ : Latin letter Ĭ
J j : Latin letter J
Ј ј : Cyrillic letter Je
Y y : Latin letter Y
Ў ў : Cyrillic letter Short U
 ̆  Combining breve U+0306

Note that breve in Й may be quite different from ordinary breve, the former having a thinner central part and thicker ends (the opposite holds for ordinary breve). This is often seen in serif fonts, cf. Й (Cyrillic Short I) and Ŭ (Latin U with breve).

Computing codes

References

External links

I